The East Carolina–Marshall football rivalry is a college football rivalry game between two public universities, East Carolina University Pirates and the Marshall University Thundering Herd. The current winner is East Carolina, who won, 42–38, on September 18, 2021. East Carolina leads the all-time series, 11–5.

History
East Carolina and Marshall have a "friendly" rivalry with one another. They are emotionally bonded by the tragic plane crash on November 14, 1970. The Thundering Herd were coming back from Greenville, North Carolina after a 17–14 loss to the Pirates when their plane crashed near Ceredo, West Virginia.

East Carolina joined Conference USA (C-USA) in 1997 as an affiliate member for football only until the 2001 season as the school moved up to full membership. When three teams from the Big East Conference moved to the ACC, the Big East looked for new members for their conference and invited five schools from C-USA to join their conference. Then C-USA added six other teams, including Marshall from the Mid-American Conference. The six new teams brought C-USA to twelve teams in which the conference can split into divisions and host a Conference USA Football Championship Game. East Carolina and Marshall were placed in the "East" division and played annually since then.

East Carolina and Marshall's most memorable games was the 2001 GMAC Bowl as they combined for a bowl record, 125 points, as Marshall overcame a 30-point deficit to beat East Carolina 64–61 in double overtime.

With East Carolina's move to the American Athletic Conference in 2014, the annual meeting with Marshall that had taken place since 2005 was discontinued. On April 3, 2014, both schools announced that the two teams will meet again for a home and home series in 2020 and 2021. East Carolina will host Marshall at Dowdy–Ficklen Stadium on September 5, 2020. Marshall will host the second  game of the series at Joan C. Edwards Stadium on September 11, 2021.

East Carolina leads the all-time record over Marshall 10–5.

Game results

See also  
 List of NCAA college football rivalry games

References

College football rivalries in the United States
East Carolina Pirates football
Marshall Thundering Herd football